"You Don't Know Me" is a song by English DJ and record producer Jax Jones featuring vocals from Raye. The song, sampling the bassline of M.A.N.D.Y. vs. Booka Shade's 2005 hit "Body Language", was released as a digital download in the United Kingdom on 9 December 2016, through Polydor Records in the United Kingdom. The song peaked at number three on the UK Singles Chart.

Music video
A lyric and audio video to accompany the release of "You Don't Know Me" was first released onto YouTube on 8 December 2016, through Jax Jones's official YouTube account. A live version of the song was also uploaded and grime MC Stormzy makes a cameo appearance.

The music video contains a little girl roaming around in her home. There were cameo appearances of both Jax Jones and RAYE. An official audio/visualiser featuring an extended version of the song was released on 9 December 2016 and reached a length of four and a half minutes. It depicted a cartoon Jax Jones dancing on a cereal box. (The same one used on the cover)

Track listing

Charts

Weekly charts

Year-end charts

Certifications

Release history

References

2016 singles
2016 songs
Jax Jones songs
Polydor Records singles
Songs with feminist themes
Songs written by Jax Jones
Songs written by MNEK
Songs written by Raye (singer)
Dance-pop songs
House music songs
Song recordings produced by Mark Ralph (record producer)
Song recordings produced by Jax Jones